The women's 200 metres T12 event at the 2020 Summer Paralympics in Tokyo took place between 3 and 4 September 2021.

Records
Prior to the competition, the existing records were as follows:

Results

Heats
Heat 1 took place on 3 September 2021, at 19:50:

Heat 2 took place on 3 September 2021, at 19:57:

Heat 3 took place on 3 September 2021, at 20:04:

Final
The final took place on 4 September, at 19:39:

References

Women's 200 metres T12
2021 in women's athletics